Michael Severs (sometimes Mike Severs) is an American guitarist.

While living in Nashville, Severs has played on many Billboard 200/U.S. Billboard Top Country Albums-charting records. He has worked on many occasions with Leland Sklar, Brent Mason, Dave Pomeroy, Dan Dugmore, Paul Franklin, Glenn Worf, Jim Horn, Terry McMillan, Bruce Bouton and Pat Severs.

On Don McLean's 2009 album Addicted to Black, Severs also appeared as a producer, engineer, as well as a drum and keyboard programmer.

He has worked with some of the biggest names in music history, such as Dolly Parton, Rod Stewart, Alabama, Eric Church, Olivia Newton-John, Paul Simon, Steve Winwood, Felix Cavaliere, Tanya Tucker, Lynyrd Skynyrd and Brian Wilson.

Discography 

 1980 - Dolly Parton - Dolly, Dolly, Dolly
 1982 - Dolly Parton - Heartbreak Express
 1983 - Dolly Parton - Burlap & Satin
 1990 - Joe Diffie - A Thousand Winding Roads
 1991 - Davis Daniel - Fighting Fire with Fire
 1993 - Kieran Halpin - The Rite Hand
 1993 - Sammy Kershaw - Haunted Heart
 1994 - Davis Daniel - Davis Daniel
 1995 - Confederate Railroad - When and Where
 1996 - Gretchen Peters - The Secret of Life
 1996 - Stephanie Bentley - Hopechest
 1996 - Jeff Foxworthy - Crank It Up: The Music Album
 1996 - Steve Wariner - No More Mr. Nice Guy
 1997 - Raybon Brothers - Raybon Brothers
 1997 - The Buffalo Club - The Buffalo Club
 1998 - Lulu Roman - Intimate Expression
 1999 - Marty Balin - Marty Balin Greatest Hits
 2000 - Christafari - Dub, Sound, and Power
 2002 - Chad Simmons - Heaven Sent
 2004 - Cledus T. Judd - Bipolar and Proud
 2008 - One Flew South - Last of the Good Guys
 2008 - Olivia Newton-John - A Celebration in Song
 2009 - Don McLean - Addicted to Black
 2009 - Eric Church - Carolina
2014- Rod Stewart- Another Country

References 

Year of birth missing (living people)
Place of birth missing (living people)
Living people
Record producers from Tennessee
Guitarists from Tennessee
Musicians from Nashville, Tennessee